Fight Stories was a pulp magazine devoted to stories of boxing. Published by Fiction House, it ran 47 issues cover-dated June 1928 to May 1932, followed by a four-year hiatus. It then ran an additional 59 issues, dated Spring 1936 - Spring 1952. It is best remembered for publishing a large number of stories by Robert E. Howard. The magazine also published fiction by Arthur J. Burks.

References

External links 

Monthly magazines published in the United States
Quarterly magazines published in the United States
Sports magazines published in the United States
Boxing magazines
Defunct magazines published in the United States
Magazines established in 1928
Magazines disestablished in 1952
Pulp magazines
Magazines published in New York City